Waddamana is a rural locality in the local government area (LGA) of Central Highlands in the Central LGA region of Tasmania. The 2016 census has a population of 4 for the state suburb of Waddamana.
It is a former 'hydro-town', at the foot of the southern side of the Central Plateau of Tasmania.

History 
Waddamana was gazetted as a locality in 1973.

It flourished with a population of over 100 in the early 1900s when the power plant situated there was being built. Waddamana Post Office opened on 18 August 1913 and closed in 1971.

It contains two decommissioned hydro-electric power stations (see Waddamana power stations), one of which is a museum, and several cottages, most of which are only used by guests. Schools often take their students to Waddamana for camps. It has gained a reputation for its harsh weather - it often snows and icing was a problem when the hydro plants were still in use.

The Tasmanian Aboriginal name waddamana means 'noisy water'.

Geography
Lake Echo forms part of the western boundary. The River Ouse flows through from north to south.

Road infrastructure
Route C178 (Waddamana Road) passes through from north to south-east. Route C177 (Bashan Road) starts at an intersection with C178 and runs south until it exits.

See also
 Lake Echo Power Station

References

Towns in Tasmania
Ghost towns in Tasmania
Localities of Central Highlands Council